Love by the Light of the Moon is a 1901 film by Edwin S. Porter, produced by the Edison Manufacturing Company. It mixes animation and live action and predates the man in the Moon theme of the 1902 French science fiction film A Trip to the Moon by Georges Méliès.

Plot
The Moon, painted with a smiling face hangs over a park at night. A young couple walking past a fence learn on a railing and look up. The Moon smiles. They embrace, and the Moon's smile gets bigger. They then sit down on a bench by a tree. The Moon's view is blocked, causing him to frown. In the last scene, the man fans the woman with his hat because the Moon has left the sky and is perched over her shoulder to see everything better.

See also
By the Light of the Moon, a 1911 film also by Porter

References

External links

American silent short films
American black-and-white films
Films directed by Edwin S. Porter
1900s American films